The 1986 Tour of the Basque Country was the 26th edition of the Tour of the Basque Country cycle race and was held from 7 April to 11 April 1986. The race started in Antzuola and finished in Andoain. The race was won by Sean Kelly of the Kas team.

General classification

References

1986
Bas